The Victoria Regional Transit System provides public transportation in the Greater Victoria region of British Columbia, Canada. Its operations are governed by the Victoria Regional Transit Commission in association with BC Transit. There were more than 16.8 million riders in 2021.

History
Transit service began in 1890 by the National Electric Tramway and Light Company with four street cars. On May 26, 1896 a packed streetcar crashed through the Point Ellice Bridge and 55 people were killed.  The Consolidated Electric Railway Company was forced into receivership by the disaster and emerged reorganized as the British Columbia Electric Railway on April 15, 1897.

The use of buses started in 1923 for outlying routes. Although trolley buses  were tried in 1945, the transit system was completely converted to motor buses in 1948. In 1961 BC Electric became part of BC Hydro, a Crown corporation, before the transit system was moved to the crown agency that would become BC Transit. In 2000, Victoria became the first city in North America to use low-floor buses and double decker buses in regular public transit service, as well as the first city to use hybrid double-decker buses. Victoria followed other BC Transit networks in on February 25, 2020 with the introduction of compressed natural gas vehicles to their fleet.

Until 2019, all BC Transit vehicles in Victoria were equipped with Trekker Breeze+ annunciators to call out streets for the blind. BC Transit's NextRide automated stop and route announcements took the place of the street announcements, along with electronic screens on all buses showing the next stop.

Operations
The transit system has a total fleet of 355 buses on 37 conventional routes and 18 community bus routes covering Greater Victoria including: Victoria, Saanich, Oak Bay, Langford, Esquimalt, View Royal, Colwood, Central Saanich, North Saanich, Sidney, Metchosin, Highlands, Sooke and Duncan.

Primary bus route destinations are: Downtown Victoria, the University of Victoria, the Royal Oak Exchange in Saanich, the CFB Dockyard in Esquimalt, Langford Exchange in Langford, the Colwood Exchange in Colwood and the B.C. Ferries terminal at Swartz Bay in North Saanich.

Routes
Routes are named for the direction of travel, thus each route has two (or more, if the route utilizes branches or short turns) names, indicating direction. Some routes also change in the evening or on weekends, which changes the route name again.

Routes are divided into three levels:
Local routes, which are shown in grey and encompass the majority of routes
Frequent routes, which are shown in light blue and have headways of 15 minutes or better Monday to Saturday, 7AM to 7PM
Regional routes, which are shown in orange and provide limited-stop service

Some routes, such as 15 Esquimalt / UVic and 50 Langford / Downtown meet the requirements of both the Frequent level and the Regional level, but are listed as Regional routes.

Route frequency in the Victoria Regional Transit System varies greatly, some routes operate on a commuter-focused schedule, such as the 51 UVic / Langford and the 65 Sooke / Downtown via Westhills, with directional departures limited to morning or afternoon times. Other local routes, such as the 13 Ten Mile Point, operate infrequently due to low demand. Only one school special operates in the Victoria Regional Transit System, the 17 Cedar Hill, which operates once per direction per weekday. Other buses operate variants of their standard routes around the bell schedule of local schools. Some routes operate only seasonally, such as the 76 UVic/Swartz Bay.

Cowichan Valley Regional Transit System
Victoria is also served by three routes in the Cowichan Valley Regional Transit System. While these routes are primarily aimed at commuters, the Saturday 44 bus from Duncan is aimed at those travelling into Victoria for the day.

Late Night Service
On Friday and Saturday evenings, BC Transit extends service on routes 4, 6, 14, 15, 27/28, and 50 until approximately 1:30 or 2AM. Late Night Service operates with headways of 30 minutes.

Fares
Current fares are listed in the table below:

Children under age five are required to be accompanied by someone age twelve or older. Until 1 September 2021, children aged five to twelve were required to pay the youth fare.

Daypasses (stylized as DayPASS) are only sold on board the bus. Since Daypasses can be bought using two tickets, they can effectively be purchased for $4.50 by purchasing a pack of ten tickets, which have a price of $2.25 per ticket.

Students at the University of Victoria, Royal Roads University, and Camosun College are part of the U-PASS program. All students pay for subsidized bus passes as part of their fees ($81.00 for four months).

Only one fare zone exists for the Victoria network, as in April 2008 the system eliminated the then $3 two zone fare.

Accessibility
Victoria's transit fleet is fully accessible, with either ramps or lifts providing access. Some bus stops are considered inaccessible due to their design, with inadequate space to accommodate wheelchairs or operation of vehicle ramps/lifts.

Paratransit services, called HandyDART, are also available. Unlike the regular bus system, HandyDART is contracted out. The system currently has 48 vans with door-to-door service for people who cannot ride the conventional buses. Booking is required and restrictions on who can use the system apply.

Fleet
 New Flyer Industries Xcelsior (Compressed Natural Gas)
 New Flyer Industries D40LF
 New Flyer Industries DE40LF (Diesel-Electric Hybrid)
 Grande West Vicinity CNG  
 Grande West Vicinity B30A
 Grande West Vicinity B350A

 Dennis Trident
 Alexander Dennis Enviro500
 Nova Bus LFS

Expansion possibilities
A proposal was made in 2011 to build a light rail line from downtown Victoria, routing along Douglas Street to Uptown, beside the Trans Canada Highway and the Galloping Goose bike path to Six Mile, then along the Old Island Highway through Colwood to Langford. Several options had been offered for LRT phased implementation, with all variations starting in downtown Victoria, and initially providing service to either Six Mile, Colwood Exchange or all the way to Langford Exchange. While the E&N rail corridor was considered as a potential route under this proposal, it wasn't selected as the ideal candidate. Full implementation of the line between downtown and Langford for initial opening was projected to cost $950 million. Long term transit network plans outlined potential rapid transit corridors for the future, including two that spanned from Uptown, with a corridor north to the Saanich Peninsula and Sidney, and a corridor east following McKenzie to UVic.

In 2018, British Columbia's Premier John Horgan rejected the idea of light rail service in the Victoria area because the area's low population would not justify light rail.

E&N rail corridor
The E&N rail tracks from up island provide access into Vic West, across the inlet from downtown Victoria. The E&N tracks used to run into downtown via the Johnson Street bridge, but as the bridge has been replaced due to deterioration, the railway component of the bridge has been permanently closed since in 2011. There is no longer rail on the Downtown side of the Johnson Street Bridge. Rail has not been installed on the new bridge, but may be installed in the future.

BC Transit has studied the E&N rail corridor as a commuter rail link from West Shore to Victoria.  A bike path is being built beside the E&N tracks, while allowing rail service to continue. No formal plans have been announced for commuter rail on this corridor.

Board of directors
The Victoria Regional Transit System is overseen by a 8-member transit commission. As of Feb. 2023, the board members are:

 Mayor Maja Tait - Chair District of Sooke
 Mayor Dean Murdock, District of Saanich
 Councillor Colin Plant, District of Saanich
 Mayor Kevin Murdoch, District of Oak Bay
 Mayor Marie-Therese Little, District of Metchosin
 Mayor Ryan Windsor, District of Central Saanich
 Mayor Maryanne Alto, City of Victoria
 Councillor Christopher Coleman - City of Victoria

References

External links
 
 Victoria Regional Transit System webpage
 BC Transit 950 million Douglas St light rail proposal
 CRD taxpayers association protest aspects of Douglas St light rail
 BC Transit Lea 1996 report offering rail service using the E&N railtracks

Transit agencies in British Columbia
Bus transport in British Columbia
Transport in the Capital Regional District